Dom Rubah Dan (also Romanized as Dom Rūbāh Dān; also known as Deh Mardū, Dehmīrdān, Dom Reydān, and Domrū Bādān) is a village in Ahram Rural District, in the Central District of Tangestan County, Bushehr Province, Iran. At the 2006 census, its population was 202, in 46 families.

References 

Populated places in Tangestan County